Future Sons & Daughters is the third full-length album by AM.

It was co-produced by Charles Newman and AM.

Videos
AM's music videos from this album were "Grand Opinion" and "Self Preservation". They were directed by Blake West.

Track listing
"A Complete Unknown" 2:24
"The Other Side" – 3:26
"It's Been So Long" – 2:56
"Darker Days" – 3:52
"Self Preservation" – 3:07
"Leavenworth" – 3:58
"Grand Opinion" – 4:35
"Fortunate Family Tree" – 3:32
"When The Dust Settles" – 3:52
"Jorge Ben" – 2:11
"Endings Are Beginnings" – 2:58
"It's Been So Long (Alternate Mix)" – 2:56 (Bonus Track) on iTunes.
"You Say These Things" – 4:13 (Bonus Track) on iTunes.
"Endings Are Beginnings (Piano Mix)" – 2:42 (Bonus Track) on iTunes.
"A Complete Unknown (Instrumental)" – 2:24 (Bonus Track) on iTunes.
"It's Been So Long (Instrumental)" – 2:54 (Bonus Track) on iTunes.
"Darker Days (Instrumental)" – 3:50 (Bonus Track) on iTunes.
"Grand Opinion (Instrumental)" – 4:34 (Bonus Track) on iTunes.
"Fortunate Family Tree (Instrumental)" – 3:29 (Bonus Track) on iTunes.

References

2010 albums
AM (musician) albums